Azerbaijan has the most mud volcanoes of any country, spread broadly across the country. 350 of the 700 volcanoes of the world are in the Azerbaijani Republic. Local people call them “yanardagh” (burning mountain), “pilpila” (terrace), “gaynacha” (boiling water) and “bozdag” (grey mountain) alongside its geographical name – mud volcanoes.

Submarine mud volcanoes
Underground and submarine mud volcanoes are also famed in Azerbaijan. There are more than 140 submarine volcanoes in the Caspian Sea. Eight islands in the Baku Archipelago are mud volcanoes by origination. The other kind of mud volcanoes are wells. Their activity can be observed among strata of various ages. According to the information, mud volcanoes initially began their activity in the territory of Azerbaijan 25 million years ago.

Eruption of mud volcanoes

About 200 eruptions have occurred in 50 volcanoes in the territory of Azerbaijani Republic since 1810. Eruption of mud volcanoes is accompanied by strong explosions and underground rumbling. Gasses come out from the deepest layers of the earth and immediately ignite. A height of a flame over volcano reaches 1000 meters (Garasu volcano). Toragay volcano erupted 6 times from 1841 to 1950.

Mud volcanoes are associated with oilfields. Rich oil and gas fields are found in the territories of mud volcanoes (Lokbatan, Garadagh, Neft Dashlari, Mishovdagh and others). In addition, lava, mud and liquid erupted by mud volcanoes are used as raw materials in chemical and construction industries and also in pharmacology.

Interesting facts

 NASA geologists studying the planet Mars, concluded that Azerbaijan's mud volcanoes have a similar structure to the uplands of Mars.
 The eruptions of volcanoes are used as raw material in the chemical and construction industries as well as in pharmacology.
 Volcanic clay and mud are used in the treatment of diseases related nervous system, skin and rheumatism.
 On September 5, 2004 the largest mud volcano in the territory of Azerbaijan was added into the Guinness World Records.
 Otman Bozdag is the second largest mud volcano, according to the local media reports. Its eruption on September 23, 2018 produced mud extrusions that has reached 4 km long and cracks as deep as 80 m.

Protection of mud volcanoes 
In 2007, the State Natural reserves were created by the decree of the President. Natural reserve covers Baku and Absheron peninsula. Illegal actions there which include construction works, pollution, and destruction are prohibited.

Origins of mud volcanoes 
Mud volcanoes appeared on the territory of the present Azerbaijan Republic 25 million years ago. Near mud volcanoes, deposits of oil and gas can be found.  Mud volcano's components can be used as raw materials for the chemical and construction industries, as well as for pharmacology.

Eruption of volcanoes 
There are several noticeable eruptions in past years:

Gotur Dag 
This volcano is located 70 km away from the capital. Last eruptions occurred in 1966 and in 1970.

Bahar 
Bahar is located 55 km away from Baku. Height reaches . The last eruption was detected in 1993.

Lokbatan 
The last eruption was in 2001.

Ayranteken 
This volcano can be considered as the most active volcanoes in Azerbaijan. The volcano is located 65 km away from the capital. Many eruptions are accompanied by underground explosions and huge flames. Height of the volcano reaches 190 meters. First eruptions are dated 1964 up to 1990. Near the volcano, 800m length cracks can be found. Breccia of this volcano covers 805 hectares.

Otman Bozdag 
This volcano erupted in September 2018. 40 meters deep, cracks were the result of the recent eruption.

Moose 
The last eruption of Moose occurred in 1970. Flames reached up to 1 km in height. Local earthquakes were located.

Dashli ada 
On July 4, 2021, at 21:51, an 8-minute long mud volcano eruption on Dashli ada in the Caspian Sea, located 10 km from an oil platform off the coast of Azerbaijan, caused a massive explosion and fireball, which was seen across the region, including from the capital Baku, 74 km to the north. The flames towered 500 meters into the air. There were no reports of injuries or damage to any oil platforms. It was speculated to either have been the eruption of a mud volcano, or the explosion of a gas pipeline. However, scientists confirm that the explosion came from a mud volcano called 'Makarov Bank', and occurred near the Umid gas field, where there are both gas pipelines, and natural pockets of compressed gas, as are commonly found in the Caspian Sea. The last previous volcanic eruption on the island was recorded in 1945 and the preceding one in 1920.

References

External links
Грязевые вулканы Азербайджана — одно из 7 новых чудес природы
О природе грязевых вулканов. Профессор В. Н. Холодов. Геологический институт РАН, Москва
Координационный Совет Азербайджанской Молодежи

 
Mud volcanoes